Chief Rabbi David Asseo (1914 – July 14, 2002) was the hakham bashi (or chief rabbi) of the Republic of Turkey from 1960 until his death in 2002.

Chief Rabbi David Asseo was the second longest serving of the chief rabbis in Europe (after Moses Rosen of Romania). In his career, he spent 40 years as chief rabbi and spiritual leader of Turkey. His deputy of seven years, Ishak Haleva, became the new hakham bashi after his death in 2002.

He was laid to rest at the Ulus Sephardi Jewish Cemetery in Istanbul.

References

1914 births
2002 deaths
20th-century Turkish rabbis
Chief rabbis of Turkey
Rabbis from Istanbul
21st-century Turkish rabbis
20th-century Sephardi Jews